Giorgi Matiashvili (born 18 December 1977) is a Georgian major general and the incumbent Chief of Georgian Defense Forces, appointed on 1 July 2020.

Born in the town of Gardabani, Matiashvili graduated from the United Military Academy of the Ministry of Defense of Georgia in 1999. He served as Deputy Commander of the East Command of the Land Forces from 2016 to 2018 and Commander of the West Command of Defense Forces from 2016 to 2018. In December 2019, he became Deputy Chief of Defense Forces and Chief of the General Staff. On 1 July 2020, he succeeded Lt-Gen Vladimer Chachibaia as Chief of Georgian Defense Forces. His awards include the Order of Honor (2012) and that of Vakhtang Gorgasali, 3rd Class (2001).

References 

1977 births
Generals from Georgia (country)
Generals of the Defense Forces of Georgia
Living people